Double Creek is a  long 3rd order tributary to South Hyco Creek in Person County, North Carolina.

Course
Double Creek rises in a pond about 1 mile northeast of Bushy Fork, North Carolina and then flows northerly to join South Hyco Creek about 3 miles southeast of Leasburg.

Watershed
Double Creek drains  of area, receives about 46.6 in/year of precipitation, has a wetness index of 385.51, and is about 52% forested.

References

Rivers of North Carolina
Rivers of Person County, North Carolina
Tributaries of the Roanoke River